Massimo Valeri (born 13 March 1972) is a former professional tennis player from Italy.

Career
Valeri was a quarter-finalist in the boys' doubles event at the 1990 French Open, with Andrei Pavel, who he had beaten in the singles draw.

In 1993, Valeri had wins over two top 100 players, Richard Fromberg in Bologna and Anders Järryd in Prague.

The Italian was a mixed doubles participant in the 1994 French Open, partnering Gabriela Sabatini. They were defeated in the opening round by Kent Kinnear and Nana Miyagi.

Valeri spent most of 1995 and 1996 away from the tour, appearing in just one Challenger tournament in each of the years.

In 1998, he defeated Carlos Costa in Palermo, before being beaten in the second round by Nicolás Lapentti. His best result that season came in the Bologna Outdoor tournament, where he and Giorgio Galimberti were losing doubles finalists.

ATP career finals

Doubles: 1 (0–1)

Challenger titles

Singles: (2)

Doubles: (4)

References

1972 births
Living people
Italian male tennis players
Tennis players from Rome